Kaveri Nisargadhama is a delta which is called as island by local people, formed by river Kaveri near Kushalnagar in the district of Kodagu, Karnataka, India.

Location
It is a holiday destination in Karnataka.

Orientation
It is a  island, with lush foliage of thick bamboo groves, sandalwood and teak trees. The island is accessible through a hanging rope bridge. There are deer, rabbits, peacocks and a children's playground as well as an orchidarium.

Facilities
Visitors are allowed to get into water at a few shallow and safe points along the river. Elephant rides and boating are some of the other attractions. It also has a forest department-run guest house and treetop bamboo cottages.

See also

 Kanive
 Suntikoppa
 Bylakuppe
 Dubare Elephant camp
 Kushalanagar
 Pilikula Nisargadhama (Mangalore)

References

External links 

 https://web.archive.org/web/20080226002728/http://www.karnatakatourism.com/hill/madikeri/ndhama.htm
 http://www.my-kannada.com/tour/cauvery-nisargadhama-kushalnagar/index.shtml
 http://www.coorgtourisminfo.com/Nisarga.asp
 http://www.malnadu.com/content/view/175/84/

Tourist attractions in Karnataka
Islands of Karnataka
Kaveri River
Geography of Kodagu district
Islands of India
Populated places in India